Il Devoto–Oli. Vocabolario della lingua italiana is one of the best-known monolingual dictionaries of the Italian language, edited by Luca Serianni and Maurizio Trifone.
Its first edition is dated 1971 and it is published annually by the Le Monnier.

External links
Official site

Italian dictionaries
1971 books